CineGrid is a non-profit organization based in California that began in 2004 in order to distribute 1 Gbit/s to 1 Pbps (Petabit per second) digital networks, utilize grid computing to manage digital media applications, and increase the demand for digital media exchange among remote participants in science, education, research, art and entertainment. With its headquarters at the California Institute for Telecommunications and Information Technology, renamed in 2013 as Qualcomm Institute (Qi) in San Diego, CineGrid is composed of 61 separate organizations and corporations. CineGrid has facilitated grants for its members through the National Science Foundation and provides access to Ethernet VLAN and TCP/IP connectivity.

In December 2013, CineGrid held an event for the first transmission of four surgeries in very high definition (4K), in real time and simultaneously, directly from Brazil to the United States.

Founding members
CineGrid is composed of innovators from scientific, artistic, and technological backgrounds. Its founding members include:

Cisco Systems
Keio University/Research Institute for Digital Media Content
Lucasfilm Ltd.
NTT Network Innovation Laboratories
Pacific Interface Inc.
Toronto Metropolitan University/Rogers Communications Centre
San Francisco State University/INGI
Sony Electronics Inc.
University of Amsterdam
University of California, San Diego/Calit2
University of Illinois Urbana-Champaign/NCSA
Electronic Visualization Laboratory
USC School of Cinematic Arts
University of Washington Research Channel

Annual conference
Every year, CineGrid holds a conference for its member at the University of California, San Diego. At the annual meeting, members are able to present their current research and technological developments. Workshops and demonstrations are held to introduce and give members first-hand experience with new networking tools and multi-media advancements. The CineGrid International Workshop Programs include several demonstrations from the CRCA Visiting Artist Lab, CRCA Spatialized Audio Lab, AESOP Wall, Hi-Per Wall, SAGE, StarCAVE, LAVID, Laboratory of Cinematic Arts (LabCine) and the Virtulab.

References

External links 
 CineGrid Website
 EVL Website
 Calit2 Website
 CineGrid Brasil Website

Organizations based in California
Grid computing projects
Information technology organizations based in North America